Goons Be Gone is the fifth studio album by American noise rock band No Age. It was released on June 5, 2020 under Drag City.

Singles
On February 25, 2020, No Age announced the release of their new album, along with the first single "Turned to String". On March 30, 2020, they released the second single and music video "Feeler", directed by Kersti Jan Werdal. The third single "War Dance" was released on April 23, 2020. On May 18, 2020, their fourth single "Head Sport Full Face" was released.

Critical reception
Goons Be Gone was met with generally positive reviews. At Metacritic, which assigns a weighted average rating out of 100 to reviews from professional publications, the album received an average score of 74, based on 10 reviews. Aggregator Album of the Year gave the album 68 out of 100 based on a critical consensus of 8 reviews. In his Substack-published "Consumer Guide" column, Robert Christgau found the band's latest iteration of grating avant-punk "deployed cleverly enough" and admired "the way they always come down on the right side of the divide between commitment and repeating yourself".

Track listing

References

No Age albums
2020 albums
Drag City (record label) albums